Karen Parker may refer to:
Karen L. Parker, American journalist
Karen Parker (lawyer), American attorney
Karen Parker (All My Children)
Karen F. Parker, American sociologist and criminologist
Karen Parker, backing vocalist with The Jesus and Mary Chain on "Just Like Honey"